COVRA (Centrale Organisatie Voor Radioactief Afval) is the only Dutch nuclear waste processing and storage company. Located in Nieuwdorp, it stores waste produced at the Borssele nuclear power plant after it is reprocessed by Areva NC in La Hague, France. The company also stores radioactive waste from hospitals and laboratories. COVRA currently has a license to operate for one hundred years.

References

External links
 

Nuclear waste companies
Companies based in Zeeland
Radioactive waste repositories
Vlissingen
Dutch companies established in 1982
Energy companies established in 1982
Waste companies established in 1982